The 1987 New Mexico Lobos football team was an American football team that represented the University of New Mexico in the Western Athletic Conference (WAC) during the 1987 NCAA Division I-A football season.  In their first season under head coach Mike Sheppard, the Lobos compiled a 0–11 record (0–8 against WAC opponents) and were outscored by a total of 444 to 209. 

The team's statistical leaders included Barry Garrison with 3,163 passing yards, Shane Hall with 315 rushing yards, and Terance Mathis with 1,132 receiving yards and 48 points scored. 

The number of televised games for the team expanded.  KGSW-TV 14 (now KLUZ-TV) broadcast five of the team's road games; the first three and the final two; live.  All of the home games were shown on a same-night basis, leaving only two contests (Colorado State and UTEP) not televised.

Schedule

References

New Mexico
New Mexico Lobos football seasons
New Mexico Lobos football